Maurice Larrouy (born 3. December 1872 in Toulouse, date and place of death unknown) was a French sport shooter who competed in the late 19th century and early 20th century in pistol shooting. He participated in Shooting at the 1900 Summer Olympics in Paris and won the gold medal in the 20 metre rapid fire pistol.

External links
 

Place of death missing
Year of death missing
French male sport shooters
ISSF pistol shooters
Olympic gold medalists for France
Olympic shooters of France
Shooters at the 1900 Summer Olympics
Sportspeople from Toulouse
Olympic medalists in shooting
Medalists at the 1900 Summer Olympics